Shawn Murphy (born December 17, 1982) is a former American football guard. He was drafted by the Miami Dolphins in the fourth round of the 2008 NFL Draft.

Murphy has also been a member of the Tampa Bay Buccaneers, Carolina Panthers, and Denver Broncos. He is the son of former Major League Baseball player Dale Murphy.

College career
He played one year of college football at Ricks College before going on a two-year Mormon mission in Brazil; on his return, he attended several schools including Dixie State College of Utah before finishing at Utah State, where he earned academic all-conference honors. As a senior in 2007, he earned one of the top consistency grades of any player at his position in the collegiate ranks. He led all WAC offensive linemen with 137 knockdown blocks while also only allowing one quarterback sack. As a result, he received All-American honorable mention and All-WAC second-team recognition.

References

External links
Tampa Bay Buccaneers bio
Miami Dolphins bio
Utah State Aggies bio

1982 births
Living people
Players of American football from Atlanta
American football offensive tackles
American football offensive guards
Utah State Aggies football players
Miami Dolphins players
Tampa Bay Buccaneers players
Carolina Panthers players
Denver Broncos players
Utah Tech Trailblazers football players
Ricks Vikings football players